Marine Fighter Attack Squadron 211 (VMFA-211) is a United States Marine Corps fighter attack squadron, currently consisting of F-35B Lightning II stealth STOVL strike fighter jets. Known as the "Wake Island Avengers" and the "Bastion Defenders", the squadron is based at Marine Corps Air Station Yuma, Arizona and falls under the command of Marine Aircraft Group 13 (MAG-13) and the 3rd Marine Aircraft Wing (3rd MAW).

Mission
VMFA-211 is an F-35B Lightning II squadron assigned to Marine Aircraft Group 13, 3rd Marine Aircraft Wing. Its mission is to intercept and destroy enemy aircraft under all weather conditions and attack and destroy surface targets in support of Marine expeditionary forces.

History

Early history

VMFA-211 was commissioned on January 1, 1937 when Marine Fighting Squadron 4 (VF-4M) at Naval Air Station San Diego, California. Although it was the second time a VF-4M had existed, the previous one was decommissioned in 1931 and it was not considered the same squadron. The squadron was decommissioned in 1933 but was recommissioned as "VF-8M" in 1935. On 1 July 1937, VF-8M was re-designated Marine Fighting Squadron 2 (VMF-2) and by the end of the year, had completely reequipped with Grumman F3F-2s which replaced their F3F-1s and a few even older F2F-1s. The squadron participated in annual Fleet Problems while at San Diego and even played a part in the making of the movie Dive Bomber. Several future Medal of Honor recipients served with the squadron during this period, including Henry Elrod, Robert Galer, and Gregory Boyington. In January 1941, the squadron moved to Marine Corps Air Station Ewa, Hawaii and was re-designated VMF-211 on July 1, 1941.

World War II

In November 1941, VMF-211 embarked 12 of its 24 F4F-3 Wildcats and 13 of its 29 pilots aboard  for movement to Wake Island, the scene of the squadron's heroic battle. On December 8, 1941 the Japanese attacked Wake, destroying seven of the aircraft on the ground. Over the next two weeks, the remaining five planes repelled numerous attacks and inflicted great losses on the enemy.

During the course of this defense, the Marine ground forces and VMF-211 caused the loss of at least four enemy warships, including the first major Japanese naval vessels sunk during the Pacific war.  The squadron was also credited with 8 aircraft destroyed. After the loss of its last aircraft, the squadron became a ground unit and fought until the surrender of the atoll. The first Marine airman to be awarded the Medal of Honor in World War II was VMF-211's Henry T. Elrod. A planned operation to reinforce Wake Island was deemed too dangerous by the fleet command, and on December 23 Wake Island was finally overrun by a numerically superior enemy.

The squadron's rear echelon at Marine Corps Air Station Ewa lost all but one of its twelve F4F-3s during the attack on Pearl Harbor, and even this lone survivor was lost when it was transferred to the Navy.  In February 1942, the squadron was commanded by future Medal of Honor recipient Harold W. Bauer. Slowly rebuilding as personnel and aircraft became available, the squadron, now under the command of Major Luther S. Moore was deployed in April 1942 to Palmyra Atoll in the Line Islands and adopted the name "Avengers" in memory of those squadron members who were killed or captured on Wake Island. When first deployed, VMF-211 was equipped with the Brewster F2A-3 and it was not until July that sufficient numbers of Grumman F4F-4 Wildcats became available to re-equip the squadron.  As the Pacific Campaign continued the squadron transitioned to the F4U Corsair for the remainder of the war.  VMF-211 participated in the Treasury-Bougainville Campaign, Battle of the Bismarck Sea, Northern Solomon, Battle of Leyte Gulf and Southern Philippine campaigns.

After World War II

After World War II, VMF-211 participated in the occupation of China where they would eventually provide cover for American forces evacuating the country before the Communist takeover in December 1948.  Following this action they returned to Marine Corps Auxiliary Air Field Edenton, North Carolina, in 1949. While operating aboard  in 1952, the squadron was re-designated Marine Attack Squadron 211 (VMA-211) when they transitioned to the AD-4N Skyraider. In 1957, the squadron received its first A4D-1 Skyhawks and subsequently moved to Marine Corps Air Station Iwakuni in Japan in 1958. VMA-211 flew several versions of the Skyhawk, receiving the A4D-2 (A-4B) in 1958, the A4D-2N (A-4C) in 1960, the A-4E in 1964, and the A-4M in 1976.

Vietnam War

With escalation of the Vietnam War, VMA-211 moved to Iwakuni Japan in 1965 and commenced the first of four deployments to Chu Lai Air Base, South Vietnam. LtCol. F.H. Thurston became the CO of the Squadron on August 25, 1967.

VMA-211 was deployed in the spring of 1972 to Naha Air Force Base and on May 16, 1972 redeployed to Bien Hoa Air Base in South Vietnam. It reinforced the USAF 8th Special Operations Squadron flying the A-37B Dragonfly, as well as F-4s tasked from Shaw AFB in support of operations against the North Vietnamese People's Army of Vietnam (PAVN) Easter Offensive.

The other unit at Bien Hoa was an AH-1 Cobra gunship squadron. The four different squadrons representing three branches of service were significant contributors to blunting, then rolling back the PAVN's siege of An Lộc, destroying significant numbers of PAVN armor being used for the first time in the war. VMA 211's A-4E were invaluable in close air support of the beleaguered ground troops in An Loc and surrounding areas. In August 1976, the squadron returned to MCAS El Toro.

Post Vietnam
In September 1987, the squadron celebrated an aviation milestone when it passed 30 years of flying the McDonnell Douglas A-4 Skyhawk. Following a UDP rotation to Westpac, VMA-211 relocated to MCAS Yuma, AZ on December 10, 1987 joining MAG-13.  After successfully completing the last overseas deployment with the A-4M Skyhawk in 1989, VMA-211 began transferring these aircraft to the 4th Marine Aircraft Wing in preparation for transition to the AV-8B Night Attack aircraft. In June 1990 the squadron began flying the Night Attack variant of the Harrier. During this time the Avengers were awarded Marine Corps Aviation Association "Attack Squadron of the Year" three times, in 1995, 1996, and 1998.

In September 2000, the squadron began introduction of the latest Harrier variant, the AV-8B II+ radar aircraft. The squadron soon fielded a complement of both Radar and Night Attack Harriers.

Global War on Terror
After the September 11 terror attacks, the squadron deployed to the Arabian Sea aboard . The Avengers participated in Operation Enduring Freedom, flying combat missions against targets in Afghanistan from January to March 2002.

After a short break, the following January found the Avengers aboard USS Bonhomme Richard. This time the squadron was headed for the Persian Gulf, in support of Operation Iraqi Freedom (OIF). In one month of combat flying, the squadron flew over 360 sorties and 640 hours of flight time. The squadron returned to Marine Corps Air Station Yuma in May 2003.

The squadron  deployed to Iraq off  from October 2004 through February 2005 where they were based at Al Asad Airbase.

In September 2006, the Avengers again deployed in support of Operation Iraqi Freedom to Al Asad Air Base.  From January til August 2009, the squadron again deployed as part of the 31st Marine Expeditionary Unit on board USS Essex.

In April 2012, the Avengers deployed in support of Operation Enduring Freedom, moving from Kandahar Airfield to British-run Camp Bastion in July.

While at Camp Bastion, the Avengers experienced six Harriers destroyed, and two severely damaged, during an attack on the base in September. Two Marines were also killed, including the squadron commander Lt. Col. Christopher K. Raible. Occurring during the heat of the 2012 Presidential campaign, John Gresham on the Defense Media Network called this successful Taliban attack "arguably the worst day in [U.S. Marine Corps] aviation history since the Tet Offensive of 1968."

In September 2014, the Avengers deployed to Bahrain to support the fight on terrorism in Iraq and Syria until April 2015.

Transition to F-35B Lightning II

The Avengers conducted their last AV-8B Harrier flight on 6 May 2016 and received their first two F-35B Lightning IIs on 9 May. On 30 June 2016, VMA-211 was redesignated as VMFA-211, becoming the second fleet squadron in the Marine Corps to operate the F-35B Lightning II as their primary aircraft.

In September 2018 VMFA-211 deployed aboard USS Essex as part of the Essex Amphibious Ready Group deployed to the United States Central Command area of operations. On 27 September 2018 an F-35B from Essex carried out an air strike using a precision-guided bomb against a Taliban position in Afghanistan, marking the first US combat use of the F-35.

On September 4, 2020 the squadron deployed to RAF Marham in the United Kingdom, with 10 F-35Bs. The squadron is scheduled to train alongside 617 Squadron of the Royal Air Force, in preparation for an upcoming deployment where the two squadrons will form the fixed-wing component embarked on  when the carrier enters its first operational deployment in 2021.

Squadron aces

The following Marines from the squadron have been credited with more than five victories in aerial combats:

 John C. Hundley - 6.0
 Julius W. Ireland - 5.333

Awards

Presidential Unit Citation with three bronze stars
Navy Unit Commendation with one silver and one bronze star
Meritorious Unit Citation
American Defense Service Medal with "BASE" clasp
Marine Corps Expeditionary Medal with "WAKE ISLAND" clasp
Asiatic-Pacific Campaign Medal with seven battle stars
World War II Victory Medal
China Service Medal
National Defense Service Medal with three bronze stars
Armed Forces Expeditionary Medal
Vietnam Service Medal with two silver and two bronze campaign stars
Afghanistan Campaign Medal with one campaign star
Iraq Campaign Medal with four campaign stars
Global War on Terrorism Expeditionary Medal
Global War on Terrorism Service Medal
Vietnam Cross of Gallantry with palm
Republic of Vietnam Campaign Medal

See also

 United States Marine Corps Aviation
 List of active United States Marine Corps aircraft squadrons

References

Bibliography

Web

 VMA-211 AD-1 Skyraider photos

External links
 

Fighter attack squadrons of the United States Marine Corps
Battle of Wake Island